Halosicyos is a genus of flowering plants belonging to the family Cucurbitaceae.

Its native range is Northern Argentina.

Species
Species:
 Halosicyos ragonesei Mart.Crov.

References

Cucurbitaceae
Cucurbitaceae genera